Iceland competed at the 1996 Summer Olympics in Atlanta, United States.

Results by event

Athletics

Men
Field events

Women
Track & road events

Combined events – Decathlon

Badminton

Gymnastics

Men's artistic individual all-around
 Rúnar Alexandersson (68th place)

Judo

Swimming

Men

Women

References
sports-reference

Nations at the 1996 Summer Olympics
1996 Summer Olympics
Summer Olympics